Brilliant Conversationalist is the second studio album by American country music artist T. Graham Brown. It was released in 1987 via Capitol Nashville.  The album includes the singles "Brilliant Conversationalist", "She Couldn't Love Me Anymore" and "The Last Resort".

Track listing

Chart performance

References

1987 albums
T. Graham Brown songs
Capitol Records Nashville albums

/